The Aphrophoridae or spittlebugs are a family of insects belonging to the order Hemiptera. There are at least 160 genera and 990 described species in Aphrophoridae.

European genera
 Aphrophora Germar 1821
 Lepyronia Amyot & Serville 1843
 Mesoptyelus Matsumura 1904
 Neophilaenus Haupt 1935
 Paraphilaenus Vilbaste 1962
 Peuceptyelus Sahlberg 1871
 Philaenus Stål 1864

See also
 List of Aphrophoridae genera
 Froghopper

References

Fauna Europaea
NCBI

 
Cercopoidea
Auchenorrhyncha families
Taxa named by William Harry Evans